Colin Holmes (born August 1938 in South Normanton, Derbyshire, England) is a British author, scholar, and historian.  He retired in 1998 and is now an Emeritus Professor of History at the University of Sheffield.

Academic career
After attending Tupton Hall Grammar School Holmes entered the University of Nottingham in 1957 as a County Major Scholar to read History. After two years he changed courses and graduated in 1960 in Economic and Social History. He subsequently received a Revis postgraduate scholarship to begin work with Professor J. D. Chambers, an authority on Britain's industrialisation in the 18th and 19th centuries, and wrote a thesis on the life and work of H. S. Tremenheere.

In 1963 Holmes was appointed to an assistant lectureship at the University of Sheffield in the Department of Economic and Social History under Sidney Pollard, then a rising star in the field of Economic History. During the 1970s the two worked closely together producing several volumes of documents covering European Economic History in the modern period. These books were: The Process of Industrialization (1968); Industrial Power and National Rivalry (1972) and The End of the Old Europe (1973). Holmes and Pollard also edited Essays in the Economic and Social History of South Yorkshire (1977 reprinted 1979). Together with Alan Booth, in 1991 Holmes edited and contributed to a "festschrift" for Pollard called Economy and Society. European Industrialisation and its Social Consequences. On Pollard's death in 1988 Holmes became his literary executor and also edited for publication Pollard's Essays on the Industrial Revolution in Britain (2000).

However, Holmes is best known for his work on British antisemitism, migration and fascism. His first major contribution to this field was an edited volume, "Immigrants and Minorities in British Society" to which he contributed an essay on "J.A.Hobson and the Jews".  In 1979 Holmes wrote Anti-Semitism in British Society 1876–1939, which proved to be an inspiration for the growth of research into the area of fascism and antisemitism in the interwar period. He also wrote influential articles on the British editions of the notorious Protocols of Zion. Holmes jointly founded the journal Immigrants and Minorities in 1981 and served as joint editor until 2012. He currently serves on its advisory panel.

In 1998 he wrote "John Bull's Island: Immigration & British Society, 1871–1971", which is widely regarded as an authoritative text on the history of migration. It focused on a wide range of groups that entered Britain in these years, their contributions to society and the varied responses they encountered. A similar but smaller study, "A Tolerant Country? Immigrants, Refugees and Minorities in Britain", appeared in 1991. Holmes's interest in migrant groups was also evident in his contribution, "The Chinese Connection" which appeared in Outsiders and Outcasts. Essays in honour of William J Fishman (1983) which he edited jointly with Geoffrey Alderman, and his two volumes of edited source material in Migration in European History.

Following his appointment as assistant lecturer Holmes later became lecturer (1965), senior lecturer (1972) and reader (1980) before being appointed to a personal professorship in the Department of History in 1989. He retired in 1998 and is now an Emeritus Professor of History in the University. During his career Holmes supervised a large number of postgraduate students, some of whom have subsequently been appointed to Chairs in British Universities, and who are often referred to as the "Sheffield School" (see Welsh History Review, June 1990. vol. 50. no. 1. p. 138). Following his retirement, in 2002 he held a Parkes Fellowship at the University of Southampton.

Holmes continues with his research interests. He contributed on British Government Policy Towards War Time Refugees in M. Conway and J Gotovitch Europe in Exile. European Exile Communities in Britain, 1940–1945 (2001). In 2008 The Burton Book co-written by Geoffrey Alderman appeared in the Journal of the Royal Asiatic Society. In 2015 his chapter William Joyce and the German Connection will come out in Ian Wallace (ed.) Voices from Exile. Much of his time recently has been consumed by working on his long-awaited political biography of William Joyce: Searching for Lord Haw-Haw: The Political Lives of William Joyce that was published by Routledge in 2016.

In 2017 together with Anne Kershen he edited An East End Legacy. Essays in Memory of William J. Fishman which was published by Routledge.

In 2018 at the Migration Museum in London he was presented with a Festschrift entitled Migrant Britain: Histories and Historiographies: Essays in Honour of Colin Holmes (Routledge Studies in Radical History and Politics) edited by Jennifer Craig-Norton, Christhard Hoffmann and Tony Kushner.

Publications

Books
The Process of Industrialization (London: Edward Arnold, 1968)
Industrial Power and National Rivalry (London: Edward Arnold, 1972)
The End of the Old Europe (London: Edward Arnold, 1973)
Essays in the Economic and Social History of South Yorkshire (Barnsley, 1977 reprinted 1979)
Immigrants and Minorities in British Society. London ; Boston : Allen & Unwin, 1978. 
Anti-Semitism in British Society: 1876–1939 (London: Edward Arnold, 1979) 
John Bull's Island: Immigration and British Society, 1871–1971. Houndmills, Basingstoke, Hampshire : Macmillan, 1988.  
Economy and Society. European Industrialisation and its Social Consequences (Leicester, 1991)
 A Tolerant Country?: Immigrants, Refugees, and Minorities in Britain  London: Faber and Faber, 1991. 
Outsiders and Outcasts. Essays in honour of William J. Fishman (London: Duckworth, 1993) pp. 214
(with Sidney Pollard;) Essays on the Industrial Revolution in Britain :(Aldershot; Burlington, Vt.: Ashgate/Variorum, 2000) 
Migration in European History. The International Library of Studies on Migration, (2 Vols., Cheltenham, UK: E. Elgar, 1996) 
Searching for Lord Haw-Haw: The Political Lives of William Joyce (Abingdon, UK: Routledge, 2016)
(with Anne Kershen) An East End Legacy. Essays in Memory of William J. Fishman (Abingdon, UK: Routledge, 2017)

In media

Radio

 Holmes wrote and presented a 30 minute programme entitled Rosa Rust (BBC Radio 4), 15 August 1998.

References

1938 births
Living people
Academics of the University of Sheffield
English historians
British writers